Si Don Chai is a tambon (subdistrict) of Chiang Khong District, in Chiang Rai Province, Thailand. In 2013, it had a population of 8,813 people. The tambon contains 18 villages.

References

External links
ThaiTambon on Si Don Chai 

Tambon of Chiang Rai province
Populated places in Chiang Rai province